Maireana glomerifolia, the ball-leaf bluebush, is a species of flowering plant in the family Amaranthaceae, native to Western Australia. It is typically found in dry, saline areas.

References

glomerifolia
Endemic flora of Australia
Endemic flora of Western Australia
Taxa named by Ferdinand von Mueller
Plants described in 1975